The 14th National Congress of the Kuomintang was the fourteenth national congress of the Kuomintang, held on 16–22 August 1993 at Taipei International Convention Center in Xinyi District, Taipei, Taiwan.

Results
Lee Teng-hui was reelected as Chairman of the Kuomintang. Lee Yuan-tzu, Hau Pei-tsun, Lin Yang-kang and Lien Chan were elected as Vice Chairmen.

See also
 Kuomintang

References

1993 conferences
1993 in Taiwan
National Congresses of the Kuomintang
Politics of Taiwan